Robert King (1723–1787) was an 18th-century Anglican priest in Ireland.

He was born in Dublin and educated at Trinity College Dublin. He was Dean of Kildare from 1782 until his death.

References

1787 deaths
Alumni of Trinity College Dublin
18th-century Irish Anglican priests
1723 births
Deans of Kildare
Christian clergy from Dublin (city)
Archdeacons of Leighlin